Lament for the Weary is Christian thrash metal band Seventh Angel's second studio album, released in 1992 on Music for Nations. The album saw the band incorporating doom metal elements to thrash. The album garnered generous reviews from British music press at the time. Lament for the Weary is a concept album about a man who suffered abuse during childhood and struggles with depression and suicidal thoughts in adulthood. On his deathbed, the man gets his childhood faith back and is not afraid to die anymore.

Recording history
The album was recorded during 4–16 July 1991 at ICC Studios with producer Roy Rowland. The album was mixed during 1–10 August 1991. John 10:10, from the New Testament, is written on the back cover of the album. The cover art for the album was done by British artist Rodney Matthews.

On the album, the style changed to a more progressive and atmospheric combination of doom metal and thrash. The guitars were tuned down to D, and the compositions include acoustic passages such as on the title track, driven with a samples of raining to create a melancholic atmosphere. The drummer Tank's musicianship is more varied compared to that on The Torment (1990). The album begins with a mid-tempo instrumental. The tempo increases as "Life in All Its Emptiness" begins. Arkley plays curbed yet intimidating solos and melodies on technical rhythm guitar riffs.

Lament for the Weary has been reissued on various record labels. In 2008, a remaster was released by Polish label Metal Mind Productions, which was limited to 2,000 copies and included the demo song "The Turning Tide" as a bonus track. In 2005 and 2018, American label Retroactive Records released remasters of the album, the latter being part of the "Legends Remastered" series of reissues.

Reception
Lynn Williams of UK magazine Cross Rhythms wrote in an issue published on 1 July 1992 that Lament for the Weary is a clear improvement over The Torment and called Lament "superior thrash". In a 2005 review of the album's reissue, The Whipping Post's Matt Morrow states that Lament for the Weary belongs to one of the very best albums of heavy metal music in general and that the album is "a classic in every sense of the word". In the 2005 reissue edition's liner notes, Nick Bolton writes that "the guitar work led one reviewer to declare that the album contains some of the best guitar solos he had ever heard". After the release, the band played concerts in Germany and the Netherlands.

In the 2018 reissue liner notes for Lament for the Weary, Ian Arkley writes: "The recordings we ended up with are something I am still very proud of."

Track listing

 live version appears on Heed the Warning: Live & Demo Recordings (2005)

 appears on the Demo Collection (2017)

Personnel

Seventh Angel
Ian Arkley – vocals, lead and acoustic guitars
Scott A. Rawson – rhythm and acoustic guitars
Andrew "Tank" Thompson – drums
Simon Brynmawr Jones – bass guitar

Production
Roy M. Rowland – producer, engineer, mixer
Steve "The Rock" Rispin – assistant mixing engineer
Matthew B. Hunt – executive producer (2018 version)Additional personnel
Rodney Matthews – artwork
Bob Underhill – photography
Seventh Angel and Roy M. Rowland – arrangements
Nick Capewell and Wayne Jukes – road crew
Jeff Mortimer – remastering at JM Mastering in London, England (2008 version)
Rob Colwell – remastering at Bombworks Sound in McKinney, Texas (2018 version)
Scott Waters (Ultimatum) – design, layout (2018 version)

References

External links
Album at Metal Archives

Seventh Angel albums
1992 albums
Concept albums
Albums with cover art by Rodney Matthews